The 1959 Rutgers Scarlet Knights football team represented Rutgers University in the 1959 NCAA University Division football season. 

In their fourth and final season under head coach John Stiegman, the Scarlet Knights compiled a 6–3 record, won the Middle Three Conference championship, and outscored their opponents 132 to 121. Rutgers finished fifth in the Middle Atlantic Conference, University Division, with a 2–2 record in conference play.

The team's statistical leaders included Sam Mudie with 339 passing yards, Jim Rogers with 161 rushing yards, and Bob Simms with 345 receiving yards.

The Scarlet Knights played their home games in Rutgers Stadium, in Piscataway, New Jersey, across the river from Rutgers' New Brunswick main campus.

Schedule

References

Rutgers
Rutgers
Rutgers Scarlet Knights football seasons
Rutgers Scarlet Knights football